Piscanivirinae is a virus subfamily of the family Tobaniviridae within the order Nidovirales which comprises different fish viruses. The virions have a viral envelope and a positive-sense single-stranded RNA genome which is linear and unsegmented.

The subfamily is hitherto bigeneric with the two genera Bafinivirus and Oncotshavirus. Both genera comprise rod shaped (bacilliform) viruses with relatively large genoms like they mostly occur in the nidoviruses. Occasionally, also strongly pleomorphic (e.g. spheric) virions were observed.

The name is a siglum typical for virus taxonomy which here supposedly refers to the host animals fishes (Latin pisces), the host species Blicca bjoerkna of the virus species White bream virus, and the overarching order of the nidoviruses.

Taxonomy 
The subfamily contains the following genera, subgenera, and species:

Bafinivirus
Blicbavirus
White bream virus
Pimfabavirus
Fathead minnow nidovirus 1
Oncotshavirus
Salnivirus
Chinook salmon nidovirus 1

References 

Nidovirales
Virus subfamilies